RIG-I (retinoic acid-inducible gene I) is a cytosolic pattern recognition receptor (PRR) responsible for the type-1 interferon (IFN1) response. RIG-I is an essential molecule in the innate immune system for recognizing cells that have been infected with a virus. These viruses can include West Nile virus, Japanese Encephalitis virus, influenza A, Sendai virus, flavivirus, and coronaviruses.  RIG-I is structurally considered a helical ATP-dependent DExD/H box RNA helicase, that recognizes short viral double-stranded RNA (dsRNA) in the cytosol during a viral infection or other irregular RNAs (i.e., non-coding RNAs). Once activated by the dsRNA, the N-terminus caspase activation and recruitment domains (CARDs) migrate and bind with CARDs attached to mitochondrial antiviral signaling protein (MAVS) to activate the signaling pathway for IFN1. IFN1s have three main functions: to limit the virus from spreading to nearby cells, promote an innate immune response, including inflammatory responses, and help activate the adaptive immune system. Other studies have shown that in different microenvironments, such as in cancerous cells, RIG-I has more functions other than viral recognition. RIG-I orthologs are found in mammals, geese, ducks, some fish, and some reptiles. RIG-I is in most cells, including various innate immune system cells, and is usually in an inactive state. Knockout mice that have been designed to have a deleted or non-functioning RIG-I gene are not healthy and typically die embryonically. If they survive, the mice have serious developmental dysfunction. The stimulator of interferon genes STING antagonizes RIG-1 by binding its N-terminus, probably as to avoid overactivation of RIG-1 signaling and the associated autoimmunity.

Structure 

RIG-I is encoded by the DDX58 gene in humans. RIG-I is a helical ATP-dependent DExD/H box RNA helicase with a repressor domain (RD) on the C-terminus that binds to the target RNA. Included on the N-terminus are two caspase activation and recruitment domains (CARDs) that are important for interactions with mitochondrial antiviral signaling protein (MAVS). RIG-I is a member of the RIG-I like receptors (RLRs) that also includes Melanoma Differentiation-Associated protein 5 (MDA5) and Laboratory of genetics physiology 2 (LGP2). RIG-I and MDA5 are both involved in activating MAVS and triggering an antiviral response.

Functions

As a Pattern Recognition Receptor

Pattern Recognition Receptors 
Pattern Recognition Receptors (PRRs) are a part of the innate immune system used for recognizing invaders. In a viral infection, a virus enters a cell, and it takes over the cell's machinery to self replicate. Once a virus has begun replication, the infected cell is no longer useful and potentially harmful to its host, and the host's immune system must be notified. RIG-I functions as a pattern recognition receptor and PRR's are the molecules that start the notification process. PRRs recognize specific Pathogen-Associated Molecular Patterns (PAMP). Once the PAMP is recognized, it can then lead to a signaling cascade producing an inflammatory response or an interferon response. PRRs are located in many different cell types, however most notably active in the innate immune system cells. In addition, they are located in many different parts of those cells, such as the cell membrane, endosomal membrane, and in the cytosol, to provide the most protection against many types of invaders (i.e., extracellular and intracellular microbes).

RIG-I PAMPs 
RIG-I is located in the cytoplasm where its function is to recognize its PAMP, which are ideally short (<300 base pairs) dsRNA with a 5′ triphosphate (5′ ppp). However, it has been noted that while not ideal, and response is weakened, RIG-I can recognize 5′ diphosphate (5′pp). This ability is important as many viruses have evolved to evade RIG-I, so having the dual ligand opens up more doors for recognition. An example of viruses evolving to evade RIG-I is in the case of certain retroviruses, such as HIV-1, encode a protease that directs RIG-I to the lysosome for degradation, and thereby evade RIG-I mediated signaling. The dsRNA can come from single-stranded RNA (ssRNA) viruses or from dsRNA viruses. The ssRNA viruses are not typically recognized as ssRNA, but through intermittent replication products in the form of dsRNA. RIG-I is also able to detect non-self 5′-triphosphorylated dsRNA transcribed from AT-rich dsDNA by DNA-dependent RNA polymerase III (Pol III). It is important to note, however, that the ligands of RIG-I are still being investigated and are controversial. Also notable, is that RIG-I can work together with MDA5 against viruses that RIG-I itself may not create a significant enough response. In addition, for many viruses, effective RIG-I-mediated antiviral responses are dependent on functionally active LGP2. Cells are synthesizing multiple types of RNA at all times, so it is important that RIG-I is not going to bind to those RNAs. Native RNA from inside the cell contains an N1 2'O-Methyl self RNA marker that deters RIG-I from binding.

Type-1 Interferon Pathway 
RIG-I is a signaling molecule and is usually in a condensed resting state until it is activated. Once RIG-1 is bound to its PAMP, molecules such as PACT and zinc antiviral protein short isoform (ZAPs), help keep RIG-I in an activated state which then keeps the caspase activation and recruitment domains (CARDs) ready for binding. The molecule will migrate to the mitochondrial antiviral signaling protein (MAVS) CARD domain and bind. RIG-I CARD interactions have their own regulatory system. Although RIG-I expresses a CARD at all times, it must be activated by the ligand before it will allow both CARDs to interact with the MAVS CARD. This interaction will start the pathway to making proinflammatory cytokines and type-1 Interferon (IFN1;IFNα and IFNβ), which create an antiviral environment. Once the IFN1s leave the cell, they can bind to IFN1 receptors on the cell surface from which they came from, or other cells close by. This will upregulate the production of more IFN1s, boosting an antiviral environment. IFN1 also activates the JAK-STAT pathway, leading to the production of IFN-stimulated genes (ISGs).

In Cancer Cells 
Usually, RIG-I recognizes foreign RNA. However, it can sometimes recognize "self" RNAs. RIG-I has been shown to enable breast cancer cells (BrCa) to resist treatments and grow because of an IFN response to noncoding RNA. In contrast, RIG-I in other types of cancer, such as acute myeloid leukemia and hepatocellular carcinoma, can act as a tumor suppressor. If cancer causing viruses infect a cell, however, RIG-I can lead to cell death. Cell death can occur via apoptosis via the caspase-3 pathway, or through IFN-dependent T cells and natural killer cells.

References

Further reading 

 
 
 
 
 
 
 
 
 
 
 
 
 
 
 
 
 

Note: RARRES3 (Gene ID: 5920) and DDX58 (Gene ID: 23586) share the RIG1/RIG-1 alias in common. RIG1 is a widely used alternative name for DExD/H-box helicase 58 (DDX58), which can be confused with the retinoic acid receptor responder 3 (RARRES3) gene, since they share the same alias. [22 Jan 2019]

RIG-I-like receptors
Intracellular receptors